Shooting is the act or process of firing of a projectile weapon.

Shooting may also refer to:

Arts, entertainment, and media
 Shooting (bridge), an approach to bidding or play in the game of bridge
 Shooting (film), an aspect of filmmaking production
 Shooting game, a video game subgenre
 The Shooting (Digital Short), a 2007 video that appeared on Saturday Night Live
 "The Shooting" (Life on Mars), a television episode
 The Shooting, a 1966 American Western film

Crime
 Mass shooting
 School shooting
Shooting (crime)
 Shooting spree

Sports
 Shooting (association football)
 Shooting sports
 Hunting and shooting in the United Kingdom

Other uses
 Shooting method, in mathematics, a means of solving differential equations
 Shooting up, a colloquialism for drug injection
 Shooting (casting, throwing) a net, in fisheries.

See also
 
 
 Chute (disambiguation)
 Shoot (disambiguation)
 Shooter (disambiguation)
 Shooting gallery (disambiguation)
 Shooting Star (disambiguation)